Mount Lofty (elevation  AHD) is the highest point in the southern Mount Lofty Ranges.

The mountain's summit has panoramic views of the city and the Adelaide plains to the west, and of the Picadilly Valley to the east. It is also popular destination for international tourists, as well as for cyclists coming up the old Mount Barker Road through Eagle on the Hill, and for walkers from Waterfall Gully.

History

Aboriginal significance
The adjacent peaks of Mount Lofty and Mount Bonython form a prominent landmark visible across the Adelaide Plains, known to the local Kaurna people as Yuridla, 'two-ears', part of the body of an ancestral being called Nganu. This Kaurna name has been preserved in its anglicised form as the name of the nearby town of Uraidla.

European discovery and use
Mount Lofty was named by Matthew Flinders on 23 March 1802 during his circumnavigation of the Australian continent. The explorer Collet Barker was the first European to climb it, in April 1831, almost six years before Adelaide was settled.

A stone cairn at the summit was originally used to mark the trig point, and in 1885 this was replaced by an obelisk which served as the central reference point for surveying purposes across Adelaide. In 1902 the obelisk was rededicated and renamed as the "Flinders Column".

The summit was closed to the public during the Second World War, when the obelisk was considered an indispensable navigation aid. A flashing strobe was fitted to the top to improve visibility at night. This strobe was removed after the war, but then re-installed in the 1990s, when the obelisk was repainted and restored during construction of a new kiosk.

Access and description
The summit can be accessed by road from the South Eastern Freeway at Crafers, and from the eastern suburbs via Greenhill Road and the Mount Lofty Scenic Route. There is a walking route up the gully from Waterfall Gully, through the Cleland National Park and from Chambers Gully. This is a 4 km uphill trek and one of Adelaide's most popular exercise circuits.

The summit provides panoramic views across Adelaide, a cafe-restaurant and a gift shop. Kangaroos are sometimes spotted on the trails leading up to the summit.

On the ridge near the summit are three television transmission towers (the northernmost being that of the ABC), and the Mount Lofty Fire Tower operated by the Country Fire Service.

Historic houses

Summit Road, Mt Lofty, was historically one of the best-known addresses in South Australia, with the summer houses of several prominent families being located there. These were all destroyed or severely damaged by the Ash Wednesday bushfires in 1983, but have subsequently been restored. They include:

 Mt Lofty House (1858) - Arthur Hardy
 Eurilla (1884) - William Milne, 1917; Lavington Bonython, 1972; Kym Bonython, 1998
 Carminow (1885) - Thomas Elder, 1905 Langdon Bonython

Other buildings, such as St Michael's House (an Anglican theological college and priory) and "Arthur's Seat", for a time known as Stawell School, a private school for girls, were never rebuilt. Part of this property was excised for the ABC-TV transmitter building and mast.

Note that historically, "Mount Lofty" addresses frequently referred to the area now known as Crafers and to parts of Stirling.

Climate

Snow

Mount Lofty is the coldest location in the Adelaide area; during winter months the temperature may not exceed 3-4 °C on some days. 

Adelaide's metropolitan area experiences mild winters, with temperatures virtually never cold enough to produce snow; the nearest snowfields to Adelaide are in central Victoria, over 700 km away. However, Mount Lofty's summit is the most common location for snow in South Australia; rare snowfalls sometimes occur in other parts of the Mount Lofty Ranges, and occasionally further north, in the Flinders and Gammon Ranges. Snowfall tends to be light (rarely lasting for more than a day) and does not take place every year. Sleet however is a regular occurrence.

The snow is a novelty for the approximately 1.4 million residents of the Adelaide Plains (particularly for children), and photographs of it have made the front page of the local newspaper many times.

General and rainfall
Mount Lofty has an oceanic climate (Cfb) in the Köppen climate classification, due to its elevation, and receives a commensurable amount of precipitation during summer to avoid the Mediterranean climate (Cs) classification, since every summer month receives more than 40 millimetres of rainfall. The annual rainfall is nearly twice the amount, and the monthly rainfall during summer more than twice the amount, of the city of Adelaide. The influence of the Mediterranean climate is present with the drying trend during summer.

Gallery

See also
List of mountains in Australia

References

External links

Lofty, Mount